Yoslaine Domínguez (born 11 April 1986) is a Cuban rower. She competed in the women's lightweight double sculls event at the 2012 Summer Olympics.

References

1986 births
Living people
Cuban female rowers
Olympic rowers of Cuba
Rowers at the 2012 Summer Olympics
People from Holguín
Pan American Games medalists in rowing
Pan American Games silver medalists for Cuba
Rowers at the 2011 Pan American Games
Medalists at the 2011 Pan American Games
21st-century Cuban women